Fraxinus excelsior 'Hessei', also known as one-leaved ash  or simple-leaved ash, is a cultivar of the Fraxinus excelsior species native to Europe and Western Asia. It is known for being vigorous, seedless, and pest resistant. It is widely cultivated as a shade tree, having lustrous, dark-green foliage.

Description
Its leaves are dark-green and singly-toothed. The tree's flowers are inconspicuously small and bloom from April to May, no seeds are produced.

References

External links
Urban Forest Ecosystems Institute - Hessei European Ash

Ornamental plant cultivars
excelsior Hessei
Trees of Europe
Trees of Asia